Bukovlje is a settlement in the Municipality of Zreče in northeastern Slovenia. The area is part of the traditional region of Styria. It is now included with the rest of the municipality in the Savinja Statistical Region.

History
Until 1998, the settlement was named Bukovlje pri Stranicah. That year, Čretvež was separated from the settlement and made a village in its own right, and Bukovlje pri Stranicah was renamed Bukovlje.

References

External links
Bukovlje at Geopedia

Populated places in the Municipality of Zreče